Avast! Recording Company is a music recording studio in Seattle, Washington. It was established in 1990 by producer Stuart Hallerman, who was soundman for Soundgarden and involved in the grunge movement coming out of Seattle at the time. The first CD released by Avast! was Crime Pays When Pigs Die by Nate Mendel and Eric Akre's Christ on a Crutch project, and the company has since worked with a number of other artists, including Screaming Trees, Soundgarden, Built to Spill, Steve Fisk, Bikini Kill, and Supersuckers. 

The so-called "Avast! Classic" studio, located at 1325 N 46th St., operated through 2008, and the present studio was set up in 2005 at 601 NW 80th St. and features two separate units: Studios A & B. The use of this building as a studio dates back to 1978, and some rooms are still as they originally were, while others have been modernized.

Recording history 
1990: Crime Pays When Pigs Die by Christ on a Crutch
1990: "Gravity Bill" by Supersuckers
1990: "Room A Thousand Years Wide" b/w "H.I.V. Baby" by Soundgarden
1991: "Rusty Cage" by Soundgarden
1992: Steel Mill by Willard
1992: Pussy Whipped by Bikini Kill
1992: Frenching the Bully by The Gits
1992: Chow Down by 7 Year Bitch
1994: New Plastic Ideas by Unwound
1994: Vulgaris by Vulgaris
1995: "Fell On Black Days" by Soundgarden
1996: The American Fadeout by Stuntman
1997: The Lonesome Crowded West  by Modest Mouse
1997: Perfect from Now On by Built to Spill
1998: The Hot Rock by Sleater-Kinney
2001: Space Country by Neo
2003: Transatlanticism by Death Cab For Cutie
2005: Plans by Death Cab For Cutie
2006: Everything All the Time by Band Of Horses
2007: Cease To Begin by Band Of Horses
2007: Fleet Foxes by Fleet Foxes
2008: We Are Beautiful, We Are Doomed by Los Campesinos!
2008: The Lucky Ones by Mudhoney
2012: The Heist by Macklemore & Ryan Lewis
2014: Primitive and Deadly by Earth
2015: Twelvefour by The Paper Kites
2020: Making a Door Less Open by Car Seat Headrest

See also 
Grunge

References

External links 
AvastRecording.com

Recording studios in Washington (state)
Companies based in Seattle